Carl Theodor Wilhelm Goldschmidt (4 June 1817 – 4 January 1875) was a German entrepreneur and chemist.

Goldschmidt was born in Berlin. He studied chemistry at the University of Berlin, and then trained as a colorist, a specialist in dyeing textiles. On 8 December 1847, he founded a chemical factory in Berlin. In 1911, it became "Th. Goldschmidt AG". Goldschmidt was a city councilor in Berlin, was interested in philosophy and maintained close contacts with the famous chemists of his time. 

Karl Goldschmidt and Hans Goldschmidt were his sons.

He died in 1875 in Berlin and was buried there. His grave is preserved in the Protestant Friedhof I der Jerusalems- und Neuen Kirchengemeinde (Cemetery No. I of the congregations of Jerusalem'spaye Church and New Church) in Berlin-Kreuzberg, south of Hallesches Tor. F

References

External links
 http://www.degussa-geschichte.de/geschichte/de/persoenlichkeiten/theodor_goldschmidt.html
 * http://www.degussa-geschichte.de/geschichte/en/inventions/monopol_soap.html
 http://www.degussa-geschichte.de/geschichte/en/predecessors/goldschmidt.print.html
 http://www.degussa-geschichte.de/geschichte/en/inventions/monopol_soap.html

1817 births
1875 deaths
19th-century German chemists
Scientists from Berlin
19th-century German Jews
Converts to Protestantism from Judaism
Humboldt University of Berlin alumni
Businesspeople from Berlin